The following Buddhist colleges and universities operate in Nepal.

Lumbini Buddhist University, Siddharthanagar, Nepal
Lumbini Bauddha University, Lumbini, Nepal
Ka-Nying Shedrub Ling, Kathmandu
Rangjung Yeshe Institute , Seto Gompa Marg, Boudhanath, Kathmandu
Kagyu Institute of Buddhist Studies, Dev Doka, Kirtipur, Kathmandu
Kathmandu University, Dhulikhel, Nepal
Benchen Monastery, Swayambhu, Nepal
Chhairo gompa, Mustang
Thrangu Tashi Yangtse Monastery, Namo Buddha, Kavre
Nagarjuna Institute, (also famous for Newari Buddhists and Hindu Buddhists)
Buddhist